Deirdre Bair (June 21, 1935 – April 17, 2020) was an American literary scholar and biographer. She won a National Book Award for her biography of Samuel Beckett in 1981.

Early life and education 
Bair was born Deirdre Bartolotta on June 21, 1935 in Pittsburgh. She grew up in nearby Monongahela, Pennsylvania. Her father was a small-business owner, her mother a homemaker. She had one sister and one brother.

Bair earned a Bachelor of Arts degree in English from the University of Pennsylvania in 1957. She went on to earn her Master of Arts degree (1968) and Doctor of Philosophy degree (1972), both in comparative literature, at Columbia University. She worked as a stringer for Newsweek and a reporter for the New Haven Register before earning her doctorate.

Academic career 
Starting in 1976, Bair served as a professor of comparative literature at the University of Pennsylvania. She resigned in 1988 to write full-time.

At various times during her life, Bair served as a visiting professor, writer in residence, or distinguished scholar at Ohio State University, Bennington College, Macquarie University, Griffith University, and Australian National University. She was also a visiting lecturer at Paris VII, University of Kassel, Uppsala University, and University College Dublin.

Bair was awarded fellowships from the John Simon Guggenheim Memorial Foundation, the Rockefeller Foundation, the New York Institute for the Humanities, the Radcliffe Institute for Advanced Study (then the Bunting Institute), and the University of Connecticut Humanities Institute, among other institutions.

Writings 
Bair authored seven biographies and one autobiography during her lifetime. She received a 1981 National Book Award for Samuel Beckett: A Biography (1978). Her biographies of Simone de Beauvoir and Carl Jung were finalists for the Los Angeles Times Book Prize in 1991 and 2004, respectively. Her biographies of Anaïs Nin (1996) and de Beauvoir (2001) were selected by The New York Times as Best Books of the Year. Her biography of Jung won the Gradiva Award from the National Association for the Advancement of Psychoanalysis in 2004.

Bair's Calling It Quits: Late-Life Divorce and Starting Over (2007) was profiled on CBS’s The Early Show, NBC's The Today Show, the Brian Lehrer radio show, and CBC Canada. She published a biography of cartoonist Saul Steinberg in 2012 (it was named a New York Times Notable Book) and a biography of Chicago mobster Al Capone in 2016, using previously unknown sources from his family. Her final book, Parisian Lives, related her experiences as Beckett's and de Beauvoir's biographer. Parisian Lives was a finalist for the 2020 Pulitzer Prize for Biography.

Personal life 
Bair married museum administrator Lavon Henry Bair in 1957. The couple had two children, Katney Bair and Vonn Scott Bair. She divorced her husband in 2007.

Bair died of a heart attack at home in New Haven, Connecticut, on April 17, 2020. She was survived by her children and other relatives. Her ex-husband predeceased her in 2012.

Bibliography

Notes

References

External links
 Deirdre Bair Collection of Samuel Beckett and Brian Coffey at the Harry Ransom Center
 Deirdre Bair: Author profile 
 Deirdre Bair at Library of Congress Authorities — with 8 catalog records
 

1935 births
2020 deaths
American biographers
American women biographers
Writers from Pittsburgh
National Book Award winners
Radcliffe fellows
Rockefeller Fellows
University of Pennsylvania faculty
University of Pennsylvania School of Arts and Sciences alumni
Columbia Graduate School of Arts and Sciences alumni